Thomas Henry Farrer, 1st Baron Farrer (24 June 1819 – 11 October 1899), was an English civil servant and statistician.

Background and early life
Farrer was the son of Thomas Farrer, a solicitor in Lincoln's Inn Fields. Born in London, he was educated at Eton College and Balliol College, Oxford, where he graduated in 1840. He was called to the bar at Lincoln's Inn in 1844, but retired from practice in the course of a few years.

Career in the civil service
He entered the public service in 1850 as secretary to the naval department (renamed the marine department in 1853) of the Board of Trade. In 1865 he was promoted to be one of the joint secretaries of the Board of Trade, and in 1867 became permanent secretary.

His tenure of the office of permanent secretary, which he held for upwards of twenty years, was marked by many reforms and an energetic administration. Not only was he an advanced Liberal in politics, but an uncompromising advocate of free trade of the strictest school. He was created a baronet for his services at the Board of Trade in 1883, and in 1886 he retired from office. During the same year he published a work entitled Free Trade versus Fair Trade, in which he dealt with an economic controversy then greatly agitating the public mind. He had already, in 1883, written a volume on The State in its Relation to Trade.

In 1889 he was co-opted by the Progressives as an alderman of the London County Council, of which he became vice-chairman in 1890. His efficiency and ability in this capacity were warmly recognized; but in the course of time divergences arose between his personal views and those of many of his colleagues. The tendency towards socialistic legislation which became apparent was quite at variance with his principles of individual enterprise and responsibility. He consequently resigned his position.

In the 1893 Birthday Honours, he was raised to the peerage as Baron Farrer, of Abinger, in the County of Surrey. From this time forward he devoted much of his energy and leisure to advocating his views at the Cobden Club, the Political Economy Club, on the platform, and in the press. His efforts were especially directed against the opinions of the Fair Trade League, and upon this and other economic controversies he wrote able, clear, and uncompromising letters, which left no doubt that he still adhered to the doctrines of free trade as advocated by its earliest exponents. In 1898 he published his Studies in Currency.

He was President of the Royal Statistical Society from 1894 to 1896.

Marriage and issue

Farrer married twice, first in 1854 to Frances Erskine (1825–1870), daughter of the historian and orientalist William Erskine (1773–1852) and his wife, Maitland Mackintosh, daughter of Sir James Mackintosh by his first wife. They bore the following children:

 Hon. Emma Cecilia "Ida" Farrer (1854–1946), married Horace Darwin, son of Charles Darwin
 Hon. Thomas Cecil Farrer (1859–1940), married Evelyn Spring Rice, daughter of Hon. Charles Spring Rice
 Claude Erskine Farrer (1862–1890)
 Hon. Noel Maitland Farrer (1867–1929)

Frances died on 15 May 1870. Farrer remarried in 1873 to his former wife's half-cousin, Katherine Euphemia Wedgwood (1839–1931), daughter of Hensleigh Wedgwood of the Wedgwood pottery family and his wife Fanny Mackintosh.

Death
Farrer died at Abinger Hall, Dorking, in 1899 and was buried at Brookwood Cemetery. He was succeeded in the title by his eldest son Thomas Cecil Farrer (1859–1940).

References

External links

1819 births
1899 deaths
Barons in the Peerage of the United Kingdom
Liberal Party (UK) hereditary peers
Members of London County Council
Permanent Secretaries of the Board of Trade
People educated at Eton College
Alumni of Balliol College, Oxford
Presidents of the Royal Statistical Society
Progressive Party (London) politicians
Burials at Brookwood Cemetery
Peers of the United Kingdom created by Queen Victoria